Esther Peter-Davis (11 September 1932 – 8 October 2022) was a French Alsatian pacifist who played a decisive role in the development of the anti-nuclear movement in France and the development of cross-border organizations for the defense of human rights and a healthy environment.

Biography
Peter-Davis was born in Strasbourg, France, on 11 September 1932. 

In 1960, Peter-Davis opposed military nuclear tests in the Sahara.

In 1970, she resided with her family including four children near (38 km as the crow flies) the Fessenheim nuclear power plant, which was just under construction. She questioned the potential long-term effects of this new technology in densely populated areas. Face-to-face are two realities for her: the displayed optimism of scientists speaking on behalf of EDF, contrasting with the deficit of objective information on the potential health effects, or disasters, on the population. According to Peter-Davis, the official speech gave a partial portrait, since the potential risks of this technology, intolerant of error, were really unknown, and the question of radioactive waste evaded or transmitted to future generations ... Initially without prejudice against the young technology, its questioning without satisfactory answers leads it, and many people in Alsace, to the conclusion that the prolonged threat of catastrophic risks to human health, and to the ecosystems on which life depends, is a heavy price to pay for electricity production. On this basis, she became one of the pioneers of the anti-nuclear movement in France, publishing with Annick Albrecht and Françoise Bucher a magazine determining the citizens' understanding of the time, of issues which official civil nuclear specialists did not talk about or spoke only positively.

Peter-Davis was co-founder of Friends of the Earth and the Verts [the Greens].

In 1985, she adapted the ecoconseil to the French context from a German experience and in 1987 founded ECO-Conseil [archive], European Institute for Environmental Consulting, headquartered in Strasbourg.

Peter-Davis was the Founder-President of the “European Network of Scientific and Technical Cooperation for Environmental Consulting” as well as of the “Laboratory Region for Sustainable Development”.

Peter-Davis was married to Garry Davis, the founder in 1948 of the Citoyens du Monde movement. She died on 8 October 2022, at the age of 90.

Awards and distinctions
1989: Winner of the Alsace Foundation "Rhin-novation" Prize
1991: Dame of the National Order of Merit
1991: French prize for good environmental management (won by the Banque Populaire du Haut-Rhin, for its program of special loans to SMEs and SMIs for investments in favor of the environment)
1993: Honored with the Global 500 Roll of Honor by UNEP (United Nations Environment Program) for its contributions to the environment
1994: The Crédit Coopératif Corporate Foundation Initiative Award
1998: The Fibre d’Or of the École du Bois

References

1932 births
2022 deaths
Knights of the Ordre national du Mérite
Alsatian people
French human rights activists
French environmentalists
People from Strasbourg